The 1939 Kansas State Wildcats football team represented Kansas State University in the 1939 college football season. The team's head football coach was Wesley Fry, in his fifth and final year of his at the helm of the Wildcats. The Wildcats played their home games in Memorial Stadium. The Wildcats finished the season with a 4–5 record with a 1–4 record in conference play. They finished in a three-way tie for last place in the Big Six Conference. The Wildcats scored 107 points and gave up 108 points.

Schedule

Homecoming game against Nebraska
Kansas State played the Nebraska Cornhuskers on October 28, 1939. This game is notable for being the first college football homecoming game ever televised., the second ever televised college football game and the first televised game west of New York City.

Kansas State scored first with a field goal, but two minutes later Nebraska took the lead. Nebraska won the game 25–9.

Although Nebraska entered the game a 12–5 favorite, the game itself was considered to a good test for Nebraska, who was undefeated at the time. The matchup was considered to be important to the outcome of the Big Six Conference championship. Nebraska ended the game as one of ten college teams in the US that were unbeaten up to that point.

References

Kansas State
Kansas State Wildcats football seasons
Kansas State Wildcats football